The Wednesday Night Wars were a period of mainstream televised American professional wrestling in which All Elite Wrestling (AEW)'s Dynamite debuted on TNT opposite WWE's NXT on the USA Network in a competition for Nielsen ratings each week. The ratings war lasted from October 2, 2019, to April 7, 2021.

This was the first direct competition between two major promotions since Total Nonstop Action Wrestling (TNA, now Impact Wrestling), briefly moved their flagship series, Impact!, to Monday nights opposite WWE Raw in 2010, and over 20 years following the original Monday Night Wars that lasted from 1995 to 2001.

AEW would win the ratings battle almost every week in both total viewership and in the viewership from the key 18–49 age demographic, and on April 13, 2021, NXT moved to Tuesday nights, ending the Wednesday Night Wars.

History

Origins

2000s–2010s: Post-Monday Night Wars
After the "Monday Night Wars", with the bankruptcy and subsequent acquisitions of both World Championship Wrestling (WCW) and Extreme Championship Wrestling (ECW), WWE became the dominant professional wrestling company in the United States. In 2008, WWE began to take a family-oriented approach, in which all of its programming received a rating of TV-PG.

In 2010, Impact Wrestling, then known as Total Nonstop Action Wrestling (TNA), which targets an adult audience, would move their flagship, weekly series, Impact!, to Monday nights on Spike TV opposite Raw from January to May 2010. Impact suffered from low ratings and ultimately returned to their regular Thursday night timeslot on May 13, 2010.

The move itself was panned by critics and viewers. In the tenth anniversary reprint of R.D. Reynolds and Bryan Alvarez's Death of WCW, the authors compared the move to the original Monday Night Wars, writing that TNA did not have the audience that WCW did, pointing out that WCW Saturday Night typically did better than WWE shows did in the weekend timeslots. Reynolds and Alvarez also wrote that TNA did not have the financial resources that WCW did.

2012: NXT's revamp 

In 2012, WWE NXT was revamped to focus exclusively on its developmental talent, with FCW (WWE's former developmental territory) being relaunched under the NXT brand. NXT became a webcast on WWE's official website, before later airing on Hulu
 and the WWE Network.
 During this period Triple H took charge of NXT.

In the years since the revamp, NXT garnered critical acclaim for its more grounded storylines and sports-based presentation compared to WWE's "main roster" programming, with fans and pundits eventually viewing the brand as its own distinct entity and its TakeOver specials to be superior in quality to WWE's monthly pay-per-views.

2018–2019: The formation of All Elite Wrestling

On January 10, 2018, Cody Rhodes and The Young Bucks, members of the stable known as The Elite, announced an independent event called All In, which was scheduled for September 1 of that year at the Sears Centre Arena in Hoffman Estates, Illinois. Tickets for the event went on sale on May 13, and sold out in less than 30 minutes. The event was attended by 11,263 people, making it the first event in North America not held by WWE or WCW to sell 10,000 tickets or more since 1993. Four months after All In, Cody, The Young Bucks, and “Hangman” Adam Page left New Japan Pro-Wrestling and Ring of Honor and announced plans to start a new wrestling promotion. The promotion, which became known as All Elite Wrestling (AEW), began operations on January 1, 2019, and announced that its first event, Double or Nothing, would be held on May 25 of that year.

Ten days before Double or Nothing was held, AEW reached a deal with WarnerMedia to broadcast a weekly show on TNT, which would later become known as Dynamite. On July 24, 2019, AEW announced that Dynamite premiered on Wednesday, October 2 and was broadcast live every week. The premiere of Dynamite marked the return of professional wrestling to a Warner-owned network after TNT broadcast the final episode of WCW Monday Nitro on March 26, 2001. AEW has been described as "the first major promotion to compete financially with WWE since the closure of WCW".

2019: NXT's move to USA Network
In August 2019, it was announced that NXT would be moving to USA Network, marking the show's first broadcast on the network since December 20, 2017, and expanding the program to a live, two-hour format. Critics felt that the move was an attempt to counterprogram Dynamite, which would premiere two weeks later. NXT premiered on USA on September 18, 2019. However, due to scheduling overlap with the final episodes of original series Suits, only the first hour of NXT was broadcast on USA for its first two weeks while the second hour was shown on WWE Network. In its first two weeks, NXT drew 1.179 and 1.006 million viewers respectively.

Wednesday Night Wars

2019: The debut of Dynamite
On October 2, 2019, Dynamite debuted on TNT, which averaged 1.409 million viewers. NXT made their full two-hour debut on USA Network on the same night, which averaged 891,000 viewers. Dynamite beat NXT in the ratings among both viewers in the 18–49 range and total viewers for its first seven episodes. NXT began to gain ground when WWE announced that the brand's wrestlers would compete at that year's Survivor Series, officially endorsing NXT as WWE's "third brand". Competitors from the NXT brand went on to win three of the five triple-threat matches at the pay-per-view, which saw NXT Women's Champion Shayna Baszler defeat Raw Women's Champion Becky Lynch and SmackDown Women's Champion Bayley in the main event. These developments helped NXT to place first in the ratings for three out of the six remaining weeks of 2019, which culminated in a match where Rhea Ripley defeated Shayna Baszler to win the women's championship on the December 18 episode. NXT ran unopposed on December 25, the final Wednesday of 2019, as Dynamite did not air due to Christmas Day.

2020: Impact of the COVID-19 pandemic
Both NXT and Dynamite began broadcasting empty arena shows in March 2020 as a result of the COVID-19 pandemic. Both shows stopped touring and started broadcasting from fixed venues. NXT was broadcast initially from Full Sail University and later, from October 2020, the WWE Performance Center. Dynamite was initially held at Daily's Place, an amphitheater adjacent to TIAA Bank Field. AEW later taped shows at the Nightmare Factory training facility in Norcross, Georgia, in late March and early April, taping up to six weeks of episodes preparing for that year's Double or Nothing pay-per-view. As live sports were allowed to resume in the Jacksonville area by early May, AEW returned to Daily's Place, which became AEW's home base for over a year.

2021: NXT moves to Tuesday and end of the Wednesday Night Wars
On March 30, 2021, it was reported that NXT would move to Tuesday nights on April 13, 2021. In January, USA Network's parent company, NBCUniversal, announced it would shut down NBC Sports Network by the end of the year, with certain sport programming rights moving to USA and streaming service Peacock. WWE confirmed the move to Tuesdays as part of a multi-year renewal agreement. The move to Tuesday nights brought an end to the Wednesday Night Wars.

Following the end of the Wednesday Night Wars, both programs benefitted in the Nielsen ratings without the direct competition. NXT's April 13 episode averaged 805,000 viewers with a 0.22 rating in the 18-49 demographic. This viewership number was an increase from the 768,000 viewers who tuned into night one of the NXT special NXT TakeOver: Stand & Deliver the previous Wednesday. The next day, Dynamite drew over 1.219 million viewers to TNT, up 77% from the prior week. This was Dynamite's best viewership number since its debut episode on October 2, 2019. AEW also placed 2nd that evening in the Cable Top 150 with a 0.44 rating in the 18-49 demographic, their best key demographic rating since the October 23, 2019 episode of Dynamite.

Comparisons between NXT and Dynamite

Viewership

Key demographic (18-49)

See also
History of professional wrestling
History of WWE
List of AEW Dynamite special episodes
List of WWE NXT special episodes

Notes

References

2010s in American television
All Elite Wrestling
History of professional wrestling
Mass media rivalries
WWE NXT
History of WWE
2020s in professional wrestling
2010s in professional wrestling
2020s in American television